is a Japanese drama series, produced and aired in 2006 by NTV. It is a 10-episode drama series that was aired from October 14, 2006 through December 16, 2006.

Synopsis
A story of love between the son of a man who runs a ship-repair factory beset with financial troubles and the well-bred daughter of a national jewelry chain store owner. The backdrop of the story is Yokohama, Japan.

A boy and a girl from highly different social backgrounds meet and fall in love, though not without obstacles. The setting is in Yokohama, a modern port city known for its romantic atmosphere. Hiroto Kanzaki (Kazuya Kamenashi) works hard every day and night for the survival of a small ship repair factory (inherited from his father) as well as the survival of his mother and younger brother, who are suffering from health problems. Living such an underprivileged life, Hiroto has forgotten how to smile. In contrast to him, Nao (Haruka Ayase) is the daughter of a popular jewelry shop owner in a fashionable street in Yokohama. She attends a prestigious exclusive women's college and grew up cheerful and blessed with affluent love. From the moment Hiroto meets her, his closed mind slowly opens up to Nao, who is so innocent that she utters whatever she thinks. Their three close friends, who are also 20-year-olds, play an important role in their developing relationship.

The scriptwriter is Eriko Kitagawa, who earned the nickname "The Goddess of Love Stories." This classic love story enables those who are in the same generation to feel empathy, or be envious of the characters' lives; and the rest, who were once 20-year-olds, to reminisce about their own "Love of My Life."

Production credits
 Screenwriter: Eriko Kitagawa
 Producer: Norihiko Nishi
 Director: Hitoshi Iwamoto
 Music: Yoshihiro Ike

Cast
Kamenashi Kazuya as 
Ayase Haruka as 
Tanaka Koki as 
Yūta Hiraoka as 
Toda Erika as 
Kaname Jun as 
Tanaka Yoshiko as 
Zaitsu Kazuo as 
Yo Kimiko as 
Saito Ryusei as

Episode Titles
Episode 01: Love across classes
Episode 02: Holding hands
Episode 03: We're through
Episode 04: My rage, your tears
Episode 05: You won't be around
Episode 06: Our secret
Episode 07: But, I...
Episode 08: Goodbye
Episode 09: We can definitely meet again
Episode 10: Just one love

References

External links
 
 

Japanese drama television series
2006 Japanese television series debuts
2006 Japanese television series endings
Nippon TV dramas
Television shows set in Yokohama